Diala Makki (born September 17, 1981) is a media personality, TV host, and journalist.

Early life and education
Makki was born on September 17, 1981 in Tehran to a Lebanese father and an Iranian mother. Makki was raised in Tyre, and began modelling at the age of 16. She studied media at the Lebanese American University, obtaining a Bachelor of Arts in Communication Arts with the emphasis of Radio, TV, and Film. While she was studying for her master's degree in International Affairs, she worked as a presenter in Future Television.

Career
As a presenter at Future Television, Makki was part of the launch of the youth channel Zen TV, where she hosted a weekly show on fashion.
In 2004, Makki joined Dubai TV. Makki and her team launched Studio 24, a weekly entertainment show. During her involvement, she covered major film festivals, including Cannes, Venice, and Berlin film festivals.

From 2009 until 2011, Makki hosted two seasons of Najm Al Khaleej, the Gulf version of American Idol, and also hosted Taratata, the biggest Arabic music talk show. She subsequently acted in two films, La Tahkom Ala Mowdao Min Khelal Al Sora in 2013 and Rise in 2014, both directed by Ali F. Mostafa.

In 2015 and 2016, Makki was named in Arabian Business magazine's feature 100 Most Powerful Arabs Under 40.

Currently, Makki hosts a fashion documentary lifestyle prime time show on Dubai TV, Mashaheer.

Philanthropy
Makki launched a campaign about domestic violence through her social media platforms and she follows up with cases to support and link them to regional NGOs in their respective countries. Makki also collaborated with Marie Claire Arabia to gather funds from luxury shoes sales to go directly to local NGOs in Dubai. She attended the CSW62 organised by the UN Women at the United Nations Headquarters in New York after being a part of their campaign raising awareness about violence against women.

References

External links
 

1981 births
Lebanese journalists
Iranian journalists
Living people
People from Tehran
Iranian people of Lebanese descent
Lebanese people of Iranian descent
Iranian television people
Lebanese television presenters
Iranian women journalists
Lebanese women journalists
Lebanese women television presenters
Iranian women television presenters
21st-century Lebanese women writers
21st-century Lebanese writers